Cyperus ankaizinensis is a species of sedge that is endemic to north eastern Madagascar.

The species was first formally described by the botanist Henri Chermezon in 1925.

See also
 List of Cyperus species

References

ankaizinensis
Taxa named by Henri Chermezon
Plants described in 1925
Endemic flora of Madagascar